Aaron Alafa (born August 5, 1983) is an American professional boxer. He was born in Visalia, California. As an amateur boxer, Alafa won multiple championships before turing professional in 2008.

Record

Amateur boxing: 37 fights 24 wins 0 KO 13 losses

Professional boxing: 5 fights, 3 wins, 1 KO, 2 losses

Career

Amateur 
Alafa was highly decorated as an amateur. Some of his notable achievements include:
2001 National Golden Gloves Light flyweight champion
2002 United States Amateur Light flyweight champion
2006 National Golden Gloves flyweight champion
2007 National Golden Gloves flyweight champion

Professional 
Alafa turned professional in 2008. He lost his third pro bout by decision.  In December 2009 he lost his fifth pro bout, leaving him with a pro record of 3–2.

See also 
List of male boxers

External links 

1983 births
Flyweight boxers
Boxers from California
Living people
American male boxers